Managing the news is the deliberate influencing of the presentation of information within the news media. The expression managing the news is often used in a negative sense. For example, people or organizations that wish to lessen the publicity concerning bad news may choose to release the information late on a Friday, giving journalists less time to pursue the story. Staying "on message" is a technique intended to limit questions and attention to a narrow scope favorable to the subject.

An example cited by the Communication, Cultural and Media Studies infobase regards a February 1996 Scott Report on arms sales to Iraq. In the United Kingdom, the report was given early to certain officials.

See also 
Propaganda
Spin (propaganda)

Sources 
 News management entry from the Communication, Cultural and Media Studies infobase, part of Cultsock
 Helen Thomas. Watchdogs of democracy?, . Chapter 5: "Spinning the News".

News media manipulation
Propaganda techniques
Public relations techniques